Atyphella dalmatia is a species of firefly in the genus Atyphella. It was discovered in 2009.

References

Lampyridae
Bioluminescent insects
Beetles described in 2009